The IPWA Light Heavyweight Championship was a professional wrestling light heavyweight championship in Independent Professional Wrestling Alliance (IPWA). The inaugural champion was Mark "The Shark" Shrader, who defeated Quinn Nash (substituting for Earl the Pearl) in a tournament final on June 7, 1996 to become the first IPWA Light Heavyweight Champion.

There were 7 officially recognized champions with Julio Sanchez winning the title a record 4-times. He was also its longest reigning champion with his second title reign lasting 273 days. Some of the top "indy cruiserweights" on the East Coast wrestled for the title during its near 6-year history with former champions including Steve Corino, Christian York, and Joey Matthews.

Title history

Names

Reigns

List of combined reigns

Footnotes

References

External links
Official website

Light heavyweight wrestling championships